William Michael "Bick" Campbell (May 1, 1898 – September 27, 1961) was an American professional baseball umpire who worked in the American League from 1928 to 1931 and in the National League in 1939 and 1940. Campbell umpired 936 major league games in his seven-year career.

Campbell died of pneumonia on September 27, 1961, in Detroit, Michigan. His son, Mike Campbell, was a college football coach.

See also
 List of Major League Baseball umpires

References

External links
 Retrosheet
 Sporting News umpire card
 

1898 births
1961 deaths
Major League Baseball umpires
Sportspeople from Memphis, Tennessee